Laura Muir (born 9 May 1993) is a Scottish middle- and long-distance runner. She is the 2020 Tokyo Olympic silver medallist in the 1500 metres, having previously finished seventh in the event at the 2016 Rio Olympics. Muir won the bronze medal at the 2022 World Championships, and has three other top five placings in 1500 m finals at the World Athletics Championships, finishing fifth in 2015, fourth in 2017 (where she was also sixth in the 5000 metres) and fifth in 2019. She is a two-time European 1500 m champion from 2018 and 2022 as well as the 2022 Commonwealth Games 1500 m champion and 800 metres bronze medallist.

Indoors, she is a two-time 2018 World Indoor Championship medallist, earning silver at 1500 m and bronze at 3000 metres, and a British record five-time European Indoor champion, including the 1500 m/3000 m double in 2017 and 2019 as the first athlete in history to achieve the 'double-double' at a European Indoor Championships. With Muir's fifth title for the 1500 m in 2023, she became the first ever Brit to claim five golds at the event, increasing her overall tally to seven European titles.

Muir first broke the British record in the 1500 metres in July 2016. She set the current record in 2021 at the Tokyo Olympics, which ranks her in the world all-time top 15. In 2017, she broke the European indoor records at both the 1000 metres and 3000 metres, and also set a British record for the indoor 5000 metres. Muir added a British record at the 1000 m in 2020, and the next year, she also broke the Scottish record in the 800 metres. Her best time for the Mile run, ranks her in the world all-time top 20. Muir is also a two-time 1500 m Diamond League winner. She is a multiple British champion.

Early life
Born on 9 May 1993 in Inverness, Scotland, Laura Muir was raised in Milnathort, Perth and Kinross since age three. She attended Kinross High School, the same school as 400 m hurdler Eilidh Doyle along with her brother Rory who is two years younger than her.

She studied veterinary medicine at the University of Glasgow, graduating in 2018. One of her lecturers was veterinary pathologist, distance runner and teammate at the 2014 Commonwealth Games, Hayley Haining.

Career
Muir made her international debut at the 2011 European Cross Country Championships, when she was part of the Great Britain junior women's team that won gold. At the end of the year, she was a nominee in the Daily Record Young Athlete of the Year awards.

At the 2013 World Championships in Athletics in Moscow Muir represented Great Britain in the 800 metres; she reached the semi-finals with a personal best time of 2:00.83.

In July 2014, at the Diamond League event in Paris, she ran 4:00.07 in the 1500 metres to break Yvonne Murray's 27-year-old Scottish record. The same month, she competed in this event at the Glasgow Commonwealth Games, but was clipped from behind with 100 m to go and placed 11th with a time of 4:14.21. Muir failed to qualify from the 1500 m heats at the European Championships in Zürich in August with a time 4:14.69. She called her run "a messy race".

She finished fifth over the 1500 m at the 2015 World Championships held in Beijing in a time of 4:11.48.

2016
On 22 July, Muir broke Kelly Holmes' British record for the 1500 metres with a time of 3:57.49 to win the Diamond League event in London's Olympic Park.

The 2016 Rio Olympic Games were unsuccessful for her, as initially slow tactical 1500 m final race turned nearly into a speed test, and placed third with 150 m to go she faded to seventh at the finish line in 4:12.88. The winner, Faith Kipyegon of Kenya in 4:08.92, ran last two laps in the fast 800 m races pace of 1:57.2.

Less than two weeks later, on 27 August, Muir showed her potential, however, beating her UK record by more than two seconds with a world-leading time of 3m 55.22s to win the event at the Diamond League meet in Paris. A few days later, she became only the third British woman to win a Diamond Trophy as she won the 1500 m title with a second-place finish in Zürich, with the third fastest ever mark by a Briton. She overtook Kipyegon in seventh and won with her in the overall standings. Her mark from Paris made her the fastest woman in the world over 1500m for the year.

2017
On 4 January, racing the 5000 metres for the second time ever, Muir broke 25-year-old British indoor record held by her fellow Scot Liz McColgan, clocking 14m 49.12s in Glasgow. She was the only competitor as it was a mixed 3K race. Exactly a month later, she set a European indoor 3000 metres record in Karlsruhe in a time of 8m 26.41s, beating Russian Liliya Shobukhova's mark by 1.45 seconds and reigning Olympic 5000 m silver medallist Hellen Obiri. On 18 February, Muir broke the European indoor 1000 metres record at the Birmingham Indoor Grand Prix. With her time of 2m 31.93s (within a second of the world record), she beat Russian Yuliya Chizhenko's European record and Kelly Holmes’s British best.

Muir continued her record-breaking form in March, dominating at the European Indoor Championships in Belgrade. She took gold in the 1500 m event, breaking Kelly Holmes’s British record and Doina Melinte's 32-year old championship best along the way, and followed it up by taking a second title in the 3000 m event with another championship record the next day. She became only the second woman to achieve this double at the European Indoor Championships after Poland's Lidia Chojecka, and only the second UK athlete after Colin Jackson to win two European Indoor titles at the same event.

She doubled up outdoors at the World Championships held in London, finishing fourth in the 1500 m and sixth in the 5000 m. Over the shorter distance Muir clocked 4:02.97 losing by only 0.38 s to the winner, Faith Kipyegon, and by just 0.07 s to South Africa's Caster Semenya in third; Jenny Simpson of USA finished second. Following the championships, she announced that she would miss the 2018 Commonwealth Games in April in order to focus on her veterinary medicine exams.

2018
In March, Muir competed at the World Indoor Championships in Birmingham, where she won the bronze medal in the 3000 m, followed by a silver medal in the 1500 m two days later. Both events were won by Ethiopia's multiple world record-holder Genzebe Dibaba. In first Muir lost to Sifan Hassan representing the Netherlands in a blanket finish by 0.1 s, but she won with Hassan by more than a second over 1500 m.

In August, she won the 1500 metres title at the European Championships Berlin 2018, her first-ever major outdoor medal as the first British woman ever to win the European 1500 m gold.

She followed this breakthrough by securing her second Diamond League title over 1500 metres in Brussels, her first since the move of the series to a championship format. Muir produced one of the most impressive wins of her career, beating three of the four fastest women in the world that year (Shelby Houlihan, Hassan and Gudaf Tsegay).

2019

In February, Muir broke the 31-year-old British indoor mile record held by Kirsty Wade by more than five seconds, stopping the clock at the world third-fastest time of 4:18.75 at the Birmingham Indoor Grand Prix. She was 1.61 s short of a European record.

In March, she became the first athlete in history to achieve the 'double-double' at a European Indoors as she defended both her 1500 m and 3000 m titles at Glasgow 2019, improving her own championship record at the longer distance.

Muir finished fifth over the 1500 m at the Doha World Championships in a time of 3:55.76.

2020–21
During first pandemic season in 2020, Muir broke Kelly Holmes' British record for the 1000 metres by almost two seconds in a time of 2m 30.82s, when finishing second behind Kipyegon at the Monaco Diamond League. She won all her three 1500 m races (Stockholm Diamond League, Chorzów, Berlin), with all times under 3:58.50. She also recorded victories in two of her six 800 m competitions (Marseille, Ostrava).

On 9 February 2021, she came up with a good start to her season in Liévin, France, becoming the first British woman to break the four-minute barrier for the indoor 1500 metres, and taking the record back from fellow Scot Jemma Reekie. Muir finished second behind Gudaf Tsegay with a time of 3m 59.58s to move to fifth on the world indoor all-time list. Over 1500 m she then won the USATF Grand Prix in Eugene, Gateshead Diamond League, and came third in Rome Diamond League (behind only Hassan and Kipyegon). At the end of June, she lost to both Keely Hodgkinson and Reekie in the 800 m at the British Championships in 2:00.24 to set a personal best of 1:56.73 in July, when winning the Monaco Diamond League.

At the delayed 2020 Tokyo Olympics in August 2021, Muir won the silver medal in the 1500 metres in a time of three minutes 54.50 seconds, improving her own British record. She beat reigning world champion in the event, Sifan Hassan (3:55.86), finishing behind only Kipyegon who ran 3:53.11. It was Scotland’s first individual Olympic medal in any track event since the 1988 Seoul Games, when Liz McColgan won 10,000 m silver.

2022

During the indoor season, Muir was unable to run for two months due to a stress fracture of her right femur, which occurred in February. Despite this, at the World Championships Eugene 22 in July, she emerged after a tough race as a bronze medal winner. She ran her third-fastest time ever for a 1500 m race with 3:55.28, finishing behind Tsegay in 3:54.52 and Kipyegon who claimed gold in 3:52.96.

About two weeks later, Muir completed in just a 24-hour span the 800 m/1500 m double at the XXII Commonwealth Games in Birmingham, earning bronze in a photo-finish in the 800 m (0.01 s ahead of Natoya Goule and behind Mary Moraa and Hodgkinson) and, in the absence of Kipyegon, winning decisively gold for the 1500 m.

The 29-year-old continued her fine season successfully defending her 1500 m European title just 12 days after her Commonwealth gold. Muir dominated the event at the European Championships Munich 2022.

She capped her medal-winning season on the road in September, with another strong showing and a course record of 4:14.8 at the New York's Fifth Avenue Mile. Her time, the fastest in the event's 41-year history, would place her fourth on the world all-time list if it was achieved on the track. There was a Scottish sweep as Jake Wightman won the men's race for the third time.

2023
Laura opened her indoor season in USA in February with victories at the New Balance Indoor Grand Prix in Boston (3000 m) and at the Millrose Games in New York (prestigious Wanamaker Mile). She then won the 1000 m at the World Indoor Tour Final in Birmingham. She rounded off her indoor campaign by collecting her fifth European indoor title at Istanbul 2023, competing in the 1500 m to become the first Brit in history to claim five golds at the European Indoors, as the accomplishment broke her tie with Colin Jackson and Jason Gardener.

Achievements
All information taken from World Athletics profile.

Personal bests

International competitions

Circuit wins and titles
  Diamond League Overall 1500 m Diamond Race title: 2016
  Diamond League 1500 m champion: 2018
 2015 – 1500m: Oslo Bislett Games
 2016 – 1500m: London Anniversary Games (, Meeting de Paris ( MR NR)
 2018 – Birmingham British Grand Prix (1000m PB), Brussels Memorial Van Damme (1500m)
 2019 – 1500m: Stockholm Bauhaus-Galan, London Anniversary Games
 2020 – 1500m: Stockholm Bauhaus-Galan (WL)
 2021 – Gateshead British Grand Prix (1500m), Monaco Herculis (800m
 2022 – Birmingham British Grand Prix (1500m)
 World Athletics Continental Tour
 2020: Marseille Meeting Pro Athlé Tour (Bronze level, 800m), Chorzów Kamila Skolimowska Memorial (1500m), Ostrava Golden Spike (800m), Berlin ISTAF (Silver level, 1500m)
 2021: Eugene USATF Grand Prix (1500m), Irvine Track Meet (Bronze level, 800m)
 World Athletics Indoor Tour
 2017: Karlsruhe Indoor Meeting (3000m), Birmingham Indoor Grand Prix (1000m)
 2019: Birmingham (Mile, NR)
 2020: Glasgow Indoor Grand Prix (1000m)
 2023: Boston New Balance Indoor Grand Prix (3000m), New York Millrose Games (Mile), Birmingham World Indoor Tour Final (1000m)

National titles
 British Athletics Championships
 800 metres: 2018
 1500 metres: 2015, 2016, 2022
 British Indoor Athletics Championships
 800 metres: 2014
 1500 metres: 2013, 2015
 3000 metres: 2018, 2019

Scottish titles
 Scottish Championships
 1500 metres: 2012
 Scottish Indoor Championships
 800 metres: 2012, 2018
 Scottish University Championships
 400 metres: 2013
 Scottish University Indoor Championships
 400 metres: 2012, 2013
 800 metres: 2012, 2013, 2016
 1500 metres: 2018

Awards and honours
 British Athletics Writers' Association
 Cliff Temple Award for British Female Athlete of the Year: 2017, 2022 (jointly with Eilish McColgan)
 Scottish Women in Sport
 Sportswoman of the Year: 2020
 Scottish Athletics
 Athlete of the Year: 2015, 2016, 2018, 2021
 Performer of the Year: 2020 (with Jemma Reekie and Jake Wightman)
 Scottish Sports Awards
 Female Athlete of the Year: 2022
 Glasgow's Sport Awards
 Glasgow Sportsperson of the Year: 2022
 British Milers' Club
 BMC Female Athlete of the Year: 2022

Miscellaneous
In 2022, one of the new streets in Muir's home town Milnathort was named in her honour.

Notes

References

External links

 

1993 births
Living people
Sportspeople from Perth and Kinross
Sportspeople from Inverness
Scottish female middle-distance runners
British female middle-distance runners
Olympic female middle-distance runners
Olympic athletes of Great Britain
Athletes (track and field) at the 2016 Summer Olympics
Athletes (track and field) at the 2020 Summer Olympics
Commonwealth Games competitors for Scotland
Athletes (track and field) at the 2014 Commonwealth Games
World Athletics Championships athletes for Great Britain
European Athletics Championships winners
European Athletics Indoor Championships winners
British Athletics Championships winners
Diamond League winners
Medalists at the 2020 Summer Olympics
Olympic silver medallists for Great Britain
Olympic silver medalists in athletics (track and field)
Scottish Olympic medallists
Commonwealth Games gold medallists for Scotland
Commonwealth Games bronze medallists for Scotland
Commonwealth Games medallists in athletics
Athletes (track and field) at the 2022 Commonwealth Games
Alumni of the University of Glasgow
Scottish veterinarians
20th-century Scottish women
21st-century Scottish women
Medallists at the 2022 Commonwealth Games